Villa Armira is a 1st-century suburban Roman villa in southeastern Bulgaria, located in the proximity of Ivaylovgrad, Haskovo Province. Discovered in 1964 during reservoir construction, it is a primary historical attraction to the Ivaylovgrad area. It is classified as a monument of culture of national importance.

It was named after the Armira River, a minor tributary of the Arda. It is a sumptuous palace villa and one of the largest and most richly decorated Ancient Roman villas excavated in Bulgaria.

History

The villa dates to the second half of the 1st century AD and originally belonged to a noble of Roman Thrace who is thought to have been the governor of the surrounding area.

It is thought to have been destroyed in the late 4th century, possibly by the Goths some time around the Battle of Adrianople of 378.

Features

The two-storey U-shaped villa spreads over  amidst a garden, with an impluvium in the middle. Villa Armira had 22 separate rooms on the ground floor alone in addition to a panoramic terrace. It was expanded eastward in the 3rd century AD with a triclinium and a hypocaust. The walls of the entire ground floor were covered in elaborately decorated white marble. The villa's complex floor mosaics display geometric designs and depictions of animals and plants. The mosaics in the master's chamber depict the 2nd century AD owner with his two children: these are the only Roman-era mosaic portraits to be discovered in Bulgaria. A common theme in the villa's decoration is the gorgon Medusa. 

Today the 2nd-century mosaic portraits of the owner and his children can be seen in the National Historical Museum in Sofia, the ceramic finds are exhibited in the National Archaeological Museum, while copies of the marble decoration are part of the Kardzhali Regional Historical Museum's fund. 

The villa itself, with many of the floor mosaics intact, underwent Phare-funded reconstruction and anastylosis and was opened for visitors in 2008.

Gallery

References

Houses completed in the 1st century
Roman villas in Bulgaria
Museums in Haskovo Province
Roman mosaics
Archaeological museums in Bulgaria
Museums of ancient Rome in Bulgaria
Armira